Songs of Praise is a BBC television programme.

Songs of Praise may also refer to:
 Songs of Praise (hymnal), a 1925 hymnal
 Songs of Praise, a 1973 album by Shuli Natan
 Songs of Praise (The Adicts album), a 1981 album by the punk band The Adicts
 "Songs of Praise" (The Vicar of Dibley), an episode of The Vicar of Dibley
 Songs of Praise (Shame album), a 2018 album by Shame

See also
 Praise (disambiguation)